Hawthorne Municipal Airport may refer to:

 Hawthorne Municipal Airport (California) or Jack Northrop Field in Hawthorne, California, United States (FAA: HHR)
 Hawthorne Industrial Airport, formerly Hawthorne Municipal Airport in Hawthorne, Nevada, United States (FAA: HTH)

See also
 Hawthorne Airport (disambiguation)